John Morgan Davis (August 9, 1906 – March 8, 1984) was the 22nd lieutenant governor of Pennsylvania from 1959 to 1963 and later was a United States district judge of the United States District Court for the Eastern District of Pennsylvania.

Education and career

Born in Shenandoah, Pennsylvania, Davis received a Bachelor of Science degree from University of Pennsylvania in 1929. He received a Bachelor of Laws from University of Pennsylvania Law School in 1932. He was in private practice of law in Philadelphia, Pennsylvania from 1933 to 1952. He was a judge of the Pennsylvania Court of Common Pleas from 1952 to 1958. He was the Lieutenant Governor of Pennsylvania from 1959 to 1963, under Governor David L. Lawrence.

Federal judicial service

Davis received a recess appointment from President Lyndon B. Johnson on January 7, 1964, to a seat on the United States District Court for the Eastern District of Pennsylvania vacated by Judge Thomas C. Egan. He was nominated by President Johnson to the same seat on February 3, 1964. He was confirmed by the United States Senate on March 14, 1964, and received his commission on March 17, 1964. He assumed senior status due to a certified disability on May 6, 1974. His service was terminated on March 8, 1984, due to his death.

References

Sources
 
 The Political Graveyard politicalgraveyard.com

1906 births
1984 deaths
20th-century American judges
20th-century American lawyers
Judges of the Pennsylvania Courts of Common Pleas
Judges of the United States District Court for the Eastern District of Pennsylvania
Lieutenant Governors of Pennsylvania
People from Shenandoah, Pennsylvania
United States district court judges appointed by Lyndon B. Johnson
University of Pennsylvania Law School alumni
University of Pennsylvania alumni